"Unmissable"  is a song by English electronic music production duo Gorgon City. It features the vocals from Zak Abel. It was released on 28 August 2014 as a single from their debut studio album Sirens. The song was written by Kye Gibbon, Matthew Robson-Scott, Jonny Coffer, James Napier and produced by Gorgon City and Jonny Coffer. It peaked at No. 19 on the UK Singles Chart.

Music video
A music video to accompany the release of "Unmissable" was first released onto YouTube on 28 August 2014 at a total length of three minutes and thirty-seven seconds.

Chart performance

Weekly charts

Release history

References

2014 singles
2014 songs
Gorgon City songs
Songs written by Jimmy Napes
Songs written by Jonny Coffer
Songs written by Kye Gibbon
Songs written by Matt Robson-Scott
Songs written by Zak Abel
Virgin EMI Records singles
Zak Abel songs